Mediha Sultan ("the praised one"; 30 July 1856 – 9 November 1928) was an Ottoman princess, the daughter of Sultan Abdulmejid I and Gülistü Kadin. She was the full sister of Sultan Mehmed VI and the half-sister of the Sultans Murad V, Abdul Hamid II and Mehmed V.

Early life
Mediha Sultan was born on 30 July 1856 at the Dolmabahçe Palace. Her father was Sultan Abdulmejid I, son of Sultan Mahmud II and Bezmiâlem Sultan. Her mother was Gülistü Kadın, daughter of Prince Tahir Bey Chachba. She had two elder twin sisters Zekiye Sultan and Fehime Sultan, death as baby, and a younger brother, Mehmed VI. In 1861 She lost both her parents, her father from tuberculosis and her mother from cholera.

She was then entrusted to the care of one other of her father's consort, Verdicenan Kadın. The relationship between the two was like mother and daughter. As Verdicenan lost her daughter Münire Sultan in 1862, she kept Mediha under close surveillance, and always helped her whenever she had problems. Her brother was entrusted to the care of Şayeste Hanim.

First marriage
Media fell in love with Ahmed Necib Pasha, son of Sheikh Necibzade Sami Bey, whom she had happened to see. Her uncle, Sultan Abdulaziz, approved of this marriage, and the preparations for the wedding preparations began during his reign. Abdul Hamid who had frowned on Necib's family because they had connections with Ali Suavi, sent Necib to Paris. It was only when Verdicenan Kadın appealed to Perestu Kadın that Necib was recalled. He was made a pasha and the marriage was arranged. Her dowry was prepared in 1876, along with her half-sisters Behice Sultan, Seniha Sultan and Naile Sultan. The marriage contract was concluded on 22 January 1879 and the wedding took place on 8 June at the Yıldız Palace. The couple was allocated Tarlabaşı Palace as their residence. 
 
The two together had a son, Sultanzade Sami Bey born in 1880, who later became personal aide-de-camp to Abdul Hamid and served in the Ertuğrul Regiment. As a member of the entourage of Şehzade Mehmed Abdülkadir, he participated in ceremonial occasions and at the Royal Mosque Processions each Friday, following on horseback behind Abdul Hamid. Mediha was widowed at Necib Pasha's death in April 1885.

Second marriage
After Necib Pasha's death, Abdul Hamid betrothed her to Mehmed Ferid Pasha, in 1885. The marriage took place on 29 April 1886. Mediha Sultan's deputy was Hafız Behram Bey and Ferid Pasha's deputy was Gazi Osman Pasha, However, no children came of this marriage.

Mediha and her husband, Ferid Pasha, settle in the Baltalimanı Water Front Palace, which was left emptied after Fatma Sultan's death in 1884, After which her palace in Tarlabaşı was allocated to Zekiye Sultan, daughter of Sultan Abdul Hamid, who lived here after her marriage in 1889.

In October 1898, she met with the German Empress Augusta Victoria in the harem of the Yıldız Palace, when the latter visited Istanbul with her husband Emperor Wilhelm II. In her memoir, Ayşe Sultan, daughter of Abdülhamid II, remembered: "Familiar as he was with his sisters' (Seniha Sultan and Mediha Sultan) habit of chattering away rapidly and guffawing, Abdülhamid II had counseled and beseeched them to behave in a dignified fashion, but nonetheless the sisters fell back on their old habits. Baba ("dad", the Sultan Abdülhamid II) felt compelled to tell the Empress, "Please forgive my sisters, they're a bit nervous."".

Mediha was widowed at Ferid Pasha's death in 1923.

Death
At the fall of Sultanate in 1922, Mediha Sultan went to live in Nice, France, where her husband died. After, she moved first to Menton and after to Sanremo, with her brother Mehmed VI. After his death in 1926 she back to Nice, where she died on 9 November 1928, at the age of seventy-two. In last years she was on bad terms with her son. He refused to take care of her and did not go to her funeral. She was buried to Nice.

Personality
Mediha was fond of European ways. She dressed beautifully and with great dignity appearing splendidly regal in her gowns with their long trains. She was petite with white skin and gorgeous black eyes, and she resembled her father. In manner, she was gracious, attractive, and wonderfully kind. Everyone in the palace loved this princess. As did Seniha Sultan, she too spoke laughingly, with an air of good humour in her voice. When these two sisters were together chatting with their brother Sultan Abdul Hamid, they would both laugh and try to amuse him and get him to smile as though they were in competition with one another.

Honours

 Order of the House of Osman
 Order of the Medjidie, Jeweled
 Order of Charity,  1st Class
 Hicaz Demiryolu Medal in Gold
 Iftikhar Sanayi Medal in Gold

Issue

Ancestry

See also
 List of Ottoman princesses

References

Sources

 
 

People from the Ottoman Empire of Abkhazian descent
1856 births
1928 deaths
19th-century Ottoman princesses
20th-century Ottoman princesses